Desert Diamond Casinos are owned and operated by the Tohono Oʼodham Nation within the borders of the U.S. state of Arizona.

The casinos employ over 1,200 Native American and non-Native American people. They provide funds for community services both on and off the Nation and generate millions of dollars in state tax revenue.

Desert Diamond Casinos currently operates in four locations in Arizona: Tucson, Sahuarita, Why, and West Valley

History 
While trying to construct the West Valley location, the Tohono O’odham Nation had a dispute with the government of Arizona. The Nation wanted to be a Class lll gaming facility, which would include table games, but the state tried to block that from happening. The Nation went to court to get the state to follow the law, which states that gambling is permitted on Indian reservations through compacts signed between the state and tribes. 

The tribe opened the West Valley casino in 2015 but the state denied it a license to operate full-fledged gambling, only granting it to be a Class II gaming facility. The casino instead has bingo-style slot machines and no card tables, and no state license to serve alcohol.

In May of 2017, the state of Arizona and the Tohono O'odham Nation settled the lawsuit, allowing the tribe to operate full-fledged Indian gambling and sell alcohol at its casino in Glendale but barred it from opening more gambling operations in the Valley.

A fifth casino is planned by the tribe and authorized by the state. It is planned for a 110-acre site located at the southeast corner of the Loop 303 freeway and Northern Parkway. The land was part of a pre-annexation development agreement by the City of Glendale since 2012, however, the Glendale City Council terminated the agreement in early 2021 to allow the Tohono O'odham Nation to build their new casino.

References

Casinos in Arizona
Tohono O'odham Nation
Phoenix metropolitan area